Atagema gibba is a species of sea slug or dorid nudibranch, a marine gastropod mollusk in the family Discodorididae.

Distribution 
This species was described from France. It has been reported from the NE Atlantic from Cornwall south to the Mediterranean Sea.

Description

Ecology
This dorid nudibranch feeds on sponges.

References

Discodorididae
Gastropods described in 1951
Taxa named by Alice Pruvot-Fol